Píla is a village and municipality in western Slovakia in  Pezinok District in the Bratislava region.

References

External links

 Official page

Villages and municipalities in Pezinok District